John B. Hart was an American football player and coach. The Yale University graduate served as head coach of the University of Texas at Austin in 1902. He holds a 6–3–1 record at Texas.

At  and weighing  Hart was one of the smallest backs Yale ever had. Hart had to leave Texas after a 12–0 loss to Texas A&M.

Head coaching record

References

Year of birth missing
Year of death missing
Texas Longhorns football coaches
Yale Bulldogs football players